The Pahang State Executive Council is the executive authority of the Government of Pahang, Malaysia. The Council is composed of the Menteri Besar, appointed by the Sultan on the basis that he is able to command a majority in the Pahang State Legislative Assembly, a number of members made up of members of the Assembly, the State Secretary, the State Legal Adviser and the State Financial Officer.

This Council is similar in structure and role to the Cabinet of Malaysia, while being smaller in size. As federal and state responsibilities differ, there are a number of portfolios that differ between the federal and state governments.

Members of the Council are selected by the Menteri Besar, appointed by the Sultan. The Council has no ministry, but instead a number of committees; each committee will take care of certain state affairs, activities and departments. Members of the Council are always the chair of a committee.

Lists of full members

Wan Rosdy II EXCO (since 2022)

Members since 28 November 2022 have been :

Wan Rosdy I EXCO (2018–2022)

Members from 15 May 2018 to 28 November 2022 were :

Ex officio members

See also 
 Sultan of Pahang
 Menteri Besar of Pahang
 Pahang State Legislative Assembly

References

External links 
 Pahang State Government

Politics of Pahang
Pahang